Airfix Model World is a monthly magazine published in the United Kingdom by Key Publishing since 2010, produced under licence from Airfix. It covers the hobby of plastic modelmaking, particularly model aircraft, but also including model cars, ships, sci-fi/spacecraft, armoured vehicles and figures. It is effectively the successor to an earlier publication, Airfix Magazine, which ceased in 1993.

References

External links

Monthly magazines published in the United Kingdom
Hobby magazines published in the United Kingdom
Magazines established in 2010